The Aeros Profi is a Ukrainian high-performance ultralight trike wing, designed and produced by Aeros of Kyiv. The wing is widely used on Aeros trikes as well as by other ultralight aircraft manufacturers.

Design and development
The base model Profi wing is a cable-braced, king post-equipped hang glider-style wing for two-place trikes, while the Profi TL is a "topless" design, lacking the king post and using streamlined lower lift struts instead of wires. The topless design lowers the overall height of the wing and allows storage in lower-roofed hangars. A carbon fibre leading edge insert is optional, while winglets are standard on the TL model.

The wing is made from bolted-together aluminum tubing, with its double surface wing covered in Dacron sailcloth. An electro-mechanical trim is optional.

Variants
Profi
Base model with a king post and cable bracing.
Profi TL
Topless model, lacking the king post, using streamlined lift struts and with standard winglets.

Applications
Aeros-2
Aeros Cross Country
Aeros del Sur Manta
Apollo Delta Jet
Apollo Jet Star
Apollo Monsoon
Exkluziv Joker

Specifications (Profi TL)

References

External links
Official Profi webpage
Official Profi TL webpage

Ultralight trike wings